Heteroecus pacificus, the beaked spindle gall wasp, is a species of gall wasp in the family Cynipidae. According to Ron Russo's book, Plant Galls of California and the Southwest, the galls appear on canyon live oak and huckleberry oak.

References

Cynipidae
Articles created by Qbugbot
Insects described in 1896

Taxa named by William Harris Ashmead
Hymenoptera of North America
Gall-inducing insects
Oak galls